Werner Kern may refer to:

 Werner Kern (football manager) (born 1946), German football coach and former manager
 Werner Kern (chemist) (1906–1985), German chemist